Holy Keane Amooti is a Ugandan gospel, dancehall and reggae artist. He has performed in Kenya, Rwanda and Tanzania, and shared stages with Papa san, Michelle Bonilla, Wilson Bugembe, Exodus, and Judith Babirye.

Early life and education
Amooti was born Mugisa Keneth on 7 July  1986, in Fort Portal.
He grew up with his grand mother in the western part of Uganda
(Kasese District). In 1998, he lost his mother  and in 2000 his father, both to HIV. In 2003, both his aunt and grand mother died. As the first born in a family of four Holy Keane was left to take care of his siblings. 
He attended Equator Model Primary School, Kasese Secondary School and graduated from Makerere University in 2012 with a bachelor's degree in performing arts and film.

Discography

Songs
 Jah Jehovah
 Guide me 
 Hero ft Becky Nantale 
 Milele & mbote ndocha
 Niiwe 
 Download ft Hawa Musa 
 He paid it 
 King and queen 
 Am to pm
 Messiah 
 Love love 
 Anatupenda 
Love love remix ft JJ Worthen

Awards and recognition
Nominated for the artist of the year in Groove awards 2012
Nominated for VIGA Awards:  Dance Hall artist of the year 
Nominated for HIPIPO Awards:Best On Stage Performer

References 

1986 births
21st-century Ugandan male singers
Ugandan gospel musicians
Living people
Makerere University alumni
Kumusha